The following are the national records in track cycling in Hong Kong by Hong Kong's national cycling federation: Hong Kong Cycling Association (HKCA).

Men

Women

References

External links
 HKCA web site

Hong Kong
Records
Track cycling
track cycling